Løkken-Vrå was a municipality (Danish, kommune) in the North Jutland County, Denmark until 1 January 2007. It was located on the northwest coast of the island of Vendsyssel-Thy on the northern Jutland peninsula.

The two main towns were Vrå and Løkken, where Vrå acted as the seat of the municipal council.

Løkken-Vrå municipality ceased to exist following the Municipality Reform of 2007 (Danish: kommunalreformen). The new municipality belongs to Region Nordjylland ("North Jutland Region").

Mayors 
 Valdemar Langthjem, 1970–1975
 Jens Baggesen, 1975–1986
 Søren Jensen, 1986–1987
 Birte Andersen, 1986–1994
 Knud Rødbro, 1994–2007

Notable people 
 Katja Schumann (born 1949) a retired circus performer; in 2015 she purchased a dilapidated former pig farm in Løkken-Vrå, renovated the property into a working animal farm, seasonal circus, and museum.
 Lone Træholt (born 1958 in Løkken) the first woman in the Danish armed forces to obtain the rank of General

References 
 Municipal statistics: NetBorger Kommunefakta, delivered from KMD aka Kommunedata (Municipal Data)
 Municipal mergers and neighbors: Eniro new municipalities map

External links 
 Hjørring municipality's official website (Danish only)

Former municipalities of Denmark
Hjørring Municipality